John Stratton may refer to:

 John Stratton (actor) (1925–1991), British actor
 John Stratton (Virginia politician) (1769–1804), American congressman and lawyer from Virginia
 John L. N. Stratton (1817–1889), American Republican Party politician in New Jersey
 John Stratton (Air Force), American soccer defender and fighter pilot
 John Stratton (cricketer) (1875–1919), English cricketer
 John Stratton, President, Verizon Enterprise Solutions
 John Young Stratton (1829/30-1905), British rural poverty reformer

See also
 John Roach Straton (1875-1929), American Baptist pastor